François Budet (3 October 1940 – 5 July 2018) was a French singer-songwriter, novelist and poet.

References

1940 births
2018 deaths
People from Côtes-d'Armor
French male singer-songwriters
French male novelists
French male poets